Burr and Burton Academy (BBA) is a private, non-profit, co-educational, day and boarding school in Manchester, Vermont, United States. It was established in 1829 through a bequest from local businessman Joseph Burr.

In addition to serving local students and families, BBA offers a boarding program for international students.

Admissions 
Burr and Burton Academy accepts all students from designated "sending towns," which vote annually to approve the school's tuition and pay the cost through education funding. Admission is also open on an annual basis to students from other, non-sending towns, as well as through BBA's International Program. 

Tuition for the 2022-23 school year is $19,200 for sending town students; $21,200 for non-sending town students; and $59,500 for boarding international students.

Notable alumni 
 James K. Batchelder, speaker of the Vermont House of Representatives
 Jacob Benton, congressman
 Charity Clark, Vermont Attorney General-elect
 Sarah Norcliffe Cleghorn, educator, author, social reformer and poet
 Carroll William Dodge, mycologist and lichenologist
 Richard Erdman, artist
 Fred A. Field, U.S. marshal for Vermont
 Kevin Hand, astrobiologist and planetary scientist
 John C. Hollister, tenth Connecticut adjutant general
 Lyman Enos Knapp, politician and lawyer
 Marcia Neugebauer, American geophysicist
 John B. Page, governor of Vermont
 Kelly Pajala, member of the Vermont House of Representatives
 Frederick M. Reed, attorney and businessman
 Joseph Wickham Roe, engineer and professor
 Betsy Shaw, American snowboarder
 Ormsby B. Thomas, congressman
Stephen A. Walker, U.S. attorney for the Southern District of New York
 Bill Wilson, co-founder of Alcoholics Anonymous

Notable staff 
 Lyman Coleman, former principal
 Harvey Dorfman, former coach
 Richard C. Overton, former teacher
 Charles C. Stroud, former teacher

References

External links 
 

Schools in Bennington County, Vermont
Buildings and structures in Manchester, Vermont
Private high schools in Vermont
Boarding schools in Vermont
Educational institutions established in 1829
1829 establishments in Vermont